Lennart Strand (13 June 1921—23 January 2004) was a Swedish middle-distance runner who specialized in the 1500 m. In this event he won the national title in 1945–47, 1949 and 1950 and the European title in 1946, beating his compatriot Henry Eriksson. Two years later he finished second behind Eriksson at the 1948 Summer Olympics. In 1947 Strand equaled Gunder Hägg's 1500 m world record of 3:43.0 in Malmö.

Strand retired from competitions in 1950 after abandoning the 1500 m final race at the European Championships. He was an accomplished piano player, and released several jazz albums in 1952. He also worked as a sportswriter for the Sydsvenska Dagbladet newspaper. Strand died in 2004 due to injuries sustained in a traffic accident in late 2003.

References

1921 births
2004 deaths
Swedish male middle-distance runners
Athletes (track and field) at the 1948 Summer Olympics
European Athletics Championships medalists
Medalists at the 1948 Summer Olympics
Olympic silver medalists for Sweden
Olympic silver medalists in athletics (track and field)
Sportspeople from Malmö